Noether's theorem or Noether's first theorem states that every differentiable symmetry of the action of a physical system with conservative forces has a corresponding conservation law. The theorem was proven by mathematician Emmy Noether in 1915 and published in 1918. The action of a physical system is the integral over time of a Lagrangian function, from which the system's behavior can be determined by the principle of least action. This theorem only applies to continuous and smooth symmetries over physical space. 

Noether's theorem is used in theoretical physics and the calculus of variations. It reveals the fundamental relation between the symmetries of a physical system and the conservation laws. It also made  modern theoretical physicists much more focused on symmetries of physical systems. A generalization of the formulations on constants of motion in Lagrangian and Hamiltonian mechanics (developed in 1788 and 1833, respectively), it does not apply to systems that cannot be modeled with a Lagrangian alone (e.g., systems with a Rayleigh dissipation function). In particular, dissipative systems with continuous symmetries need not have a corresponding conservation law.

Basic illustrations and background
As an illustration, if a physical system behaves the same regardless of how it is oriented in space (that is, it's invariant,) its Lagrangian is symmetric under continuous rotation: from this symmetry, Noether's theorem dictates that the angular momentum of the system be conserved, as a consequence of its laws of motion. The physical system itself need not be symmetric; a jagged asteroid tumbling in space conserves angular momentum despite its asymmetry. It is the laws of its motion that are symmetric.

As another example, if a physical process exhibits the same outcomes regardless of place or time, then its Lagrangian is symmetric under continuous translations in space and time respectively: by Noether's theorem, these symmetries account for the conservation laws of linear momentum and energy within this system, respectively.

Noether's theorem is important, both because of the insight it gives into conservation laws, and also as a practical calculational tool. It allows investigators to determine the conserved quantities (invariants) from the observed symmetries of a physical system. Conversely, it allows researchers to consider whole classes of hypothetical Lagrangians with given invariants, to describe a physical system. As an illustration, suppose that a physical theory is proposed which conserves a quantity X. A researcher can calculate the types of Lagrangians that conserve X through a continuous symmetry.  Due to Noether's theorem, the properties of these Lagrangians provide further criteria to understand the implications and judge the fitness of the new theory. Noether's theorem is so well incorporated into QFT that:"...any results seeming to break that theorem can immediately be declared as hiding a calculational error."allowing it to act as a mathematical model for much contemporary research in physics. 

There are numerous versions of Noether's theorem, with varying degrees of generality. There are natural quantum counterparts of this theorem, expressed in  the Ward–Takahashi identities. Generalizations of Noether's theorem to superspaces also exist.

Informal statement of the theorem 
All fine technical points aside, Noether's theorem can be stated informally:

A more sophisticated version of the theorem involving fields states that:

The word "symmetry" in the above statement refers more precisely to the covariance of the form that a physical law takes with respect to a one-dimensional Lie group of transformations satisfying certain technical criteria. The conservation law of a physical quantity is usually expressed as a continuity equation.

The formal proof of the theorem utilizes the condition of invariance to derive an expression for a current associated with a conserved physical quantity. In modern (since c. 1980) terminology, the  conserved quantity is called the Noether charge, while the flow carrying that charge is called the Noether current. The Noether current is defined up to a solenoidal (divergenceless) vector field.

In the context of gravitation, Felix Klein's statement of Noether's theorem for action I stipulates for the invariants:

Brief illustration and overview of the concept

The main idea behind Noether's theorem is most easily illustrated by a system with one coordinate  and a continuous symmetry  (gray arrows on the diagram). Consider any trajectory  (bold on the diagram) that satisfies the system's laws of motion. That is, the action  governing this system is stationary on this trajectory, i.e. does not change under any local variation of the trajectory. In particular it would not change under a variation that applies the symmetry flow  on a time segment  and is motionless outside that segment. To keep the trajectory continuous, we use "buffering" periods of small time  to transition between the segments gradually.

The total change in the action  now comprises changes brought by every interval in play. Parts, where variation itself vanishes, bring no . The middle part does not change the action either, because its transformation  is a symmetry and thus preserves the Lagrangian  and the action . The only remaining parts are the "buffering" pieces. Roughly speaking, they contribute mostly through their "slanting" .

That is

meaning the quantity  is conserved, which is the conclusion of Noether's theorem.

More general cases follow the same idea:

Historical context

A conservation law states that some quantity X in the mathematical description of a system's evolution remains constant throughout its motion – it is an invariant.   Mathematically, the rate of change of X (its derivative with respect to time) is zero,

Such quantities are said to be conserved; they are often called constants of motion (although motion per se need not be involved, just evolution in time). For example, if the energy of a system is conserved, its energy is invariant at all times, which imposes a constraint on the system's motion and may help in solving for it. Aside from insights that such constants of motion give into the nature of a system, they are a useful calculational tool; for example, an approximate solution can be corrected by finding the nearest state that satisfies the suitable conservation laws.

The earliest constants of motion discovered were momentum and kinetic energy, which were proposed in the 17th century by René Descartes and Gottfried Leibniz on the basis of collision experiments, and refined by subsequent researchers. Isaac Newton was the first to enunciate the conservation of momentum in its modern form, and showed that it was a consequence of Newton's third law. According to general relativity, the conservation laws of linear momentum, energy and angular momentum are only exactly true globally when expressed in terms of the  sum of the stress–energy tensor (non-gravitational stress–energy) and the Landau–Lifshitz stress–energy–momentum pseudotensor (gravitational stress–energy). The local conservation of non-gravitational linear momentum and energy in a free-falling reference frame is expressed by the vanishing of the covariant divergence of the stress–energy tensor. Another important conserved quantity, discovered in studies of the celestial mechanics of astronomical bodies, is the Laplace–Runge–Lenz vector.

In the late 18th and early 19th centuries, physicists developed more systematic methods for discovering invariants. A major advance came in 1788 with the development of Lagrangian mechanics, which is related to the principle of least action. In this approach, the state of the system can be described by any type of generalized coordinates q; the laws of motion need not be expressed in a Cartesian coordinate system, as was customary in Newtonian mechanics. The action is defined as the time integral I of a function known as the Lagrangian L

where the dot over q signifies the rate of change of the coordinates q,

Hamilton's principle states that the physical path q(t)—the one actually taken by the system—is a path for which infinitesimal variations in that path cause no change in I, at least up to first order. This principle results in the Euler–Lagrange equations,

Thus, if one of the coordinates, say qk, does not appear in the Lagrangian, the right-hand side of the equation is zero, and the left-hand side requires that

where the momentum

is conserved throughout the motion (on the physical path).

Thus, the absence of the ignorable coordinate qk from the Lagrangian implies that the Lagrangian is unaffected by changes or transformations of qk; the Lagrangian is invariant, and is said to exhibit a symmetry under such transformations. This is the seed idea generalized in Noether's theorem.

Several alternative methods for finding conserved quantities were developed in the 19th century, especially by William Rowan Hamilton. For example, he developed a theory of canonical transformations which allowed changing coordinates so that some coordinates disappeared from the Lagrangian, as above, resulting in conserved canonical momenta. Another approach, and perhaps the most efficient for finding conserved quantities, is the Hamilton–Jacobi equation.

Mathematical expression

Simple form using perturbations

The essence of Noether's theorem is generalizing the notion of ignorable coordinates.

One can assume that the Lagrangian L defined above is invariant under small perturbations (warpings) of the time variable t and the generalized coordinates q. One may write

where the perturbations δt and δq are both small, but variable. For generality, assume there are (say) N such symmetry transformations of the action, i.e. transformations leaving the action unchanged; labelled by an index r = 1, 2, 3, ..., N.

Then the resultant perturbation can be written as a linear sum of the individual types of perturbations,

where εr are infinitesimal parameter coefficients corresponding to each: 
 generator Tr of time evolution, and
 generator Qr of the generalized coordinates.
For translations, Qr is a constant with units of length; for rotations, it is an expression linear in the components of q, and the parameters make up an angle.

Using these definitions, Noether showed that the N quantities

are conserved (constants of motion).

Examples 

I. Time invariance

For illustration, consider a Lagrangian that does not depend on time, i.e., that is invariant (symmetric) under changes t → t + δt, without any change in the coordinates q. In this case, N = 1, T = 1 and Q = 0; the corresponding conserved quantity is the total energy H

II. Translational invariance

Consider a Lagrangian which does not depend on an ("ignorable", as above) coordinate qk; so  it is invariant (symmetric) under changes qk → qk + δqk. In that case, N = 1, T = 0, and Qk = 1; the conserved quantity is the corresponding linear momentum pk

In special and general relativity, these two conservation laws can be expressed either globally (as it is done above), or locally as a continuity equation. The global versions can be united into a single global conservation law: the conservation of the energy-momentum 4-vector. The local versions of energy and momentum conservation (at any point in space-time) can also be united, into the conservation of a quantity defined locally at the space-time point: the stress–energy tensor (this will be derived in the next section).

III. Rotational invariance

The conservation of the angular momentum L = r × p is  analogous to its linear momentum counterpart. It is assumed that the symmetry of the Lagrangian is rotational, i.e., that the Lagrangian does not depend on the absolute orientation of the physical system in space. For concreteness, assume that the Lagrangian does not change under small rotations of an angle δθ about an axis n; such a rotation transforms the Cartesian coordinates by the equation

Since time is not being transformed, T = 0, and N = 1. Taking δθ as the ε parameter and the Cartesian coordinates r as the generalized coordinates q, the corresponding Q variables are given by

Then Noether's theorem states that the following quantity is conserved,

In other words, the component of the angular momentum L along the n axis is conserved. And if n is arbitrary, i.e., if the system is insensitive to any rotation, then every component of L is conserved; in short, angular momentum is conserved.

Field theory version
Although useful in its own right, the version of Noether's theorem just given is a special case of the general version derived in 1915. To give the flavor of the general theorem, a version of Noether's theorem for continuous fields in four-dimensional space–time is now given. Since field theory problems are more common in modern physics than mechanics problems, this field theory version is the most commonly used (or most often implemented) version of Noether's theorem.

Let there be a set of differentiable fields  defined over all space and time; for example, the temperature  would be representative of such a field, being a number defined at every place and time. The principle of least action can be applied to such fields, but the action is now an integral over space and time

(the theorem can be further generalized to the case where the Lagrangian depends on up to the nth derivative, and can also be formulated using jet bundles).

A continuous transformation of the fields  can be written infinitesimally as

This will certainly be true if the Lagrangian density  is left invariant, but it will also be true if the Lagrangian changes by a divergence,

since the integral of a divergence becomes a boundary term according to the divergence theorem. A system described by a given action might have multiple independent symmetries of this type, indexed by  so the most general symmetry transformation would be written as

with the consequence

For such systems, Noether's theorem states that there are  conserved current densities

(where the dot product is understood to contract the field indices, not the  index or  index).

In such cases, the conservation law is expressed in a four-dimensional way

which expresses the idea that the amount of a conserved quantity within a sphere cannot change unless some of it flows out of the sphere. For example, electric charge is conserved; the amount of charge within a sphere cannot change unless some of the charge leaves the sphere.

For illustration, consider a physical system of fields that behaves the same under translations in time and space, as considered above; in other words,  is constant in its third argument. In that case, N = 4, one for each dimension of space and time. An infinitesimal translation in space,  (with  denoting the Kronecker delta), affects the fields as : that is, relabelling the coordinates is equivalent to leaving the coordinates in place while translating the field itself, which in turn is equivalent to transforming the field by replacing its value at each point  with the value at the point  "behind" it which would be mapped onto  by the infinitesimal displacement under consideration. Since this is infinitesimal, we may write this transformation as

The Lagrangian density transforms in the same way, so

To wit, by using the expression given earlier, and collecting the four conserved currents (one for each ) into a tensor , Noether's theorem gives

with

(However, the  obtained in this way may differ from the symmetric tensor used as the source term in general relativity; see Canonical stress–energy tensor.)

The conservation of electric charge, by contrast, can be derived by considering Ψ linear in the fields φ rather than in the derivatives. In quantum mechanics, the probability amplitude ψ(x) of finding a particle at a point x is a complex field φ, because it ascribes a complex number to every point in space and time. The probability amplitude itself is physically unmeasurable; only the probability p = |ψ|2 can be inferred  from a set of  measurements. Therefore, the system is invariant under transformations of the ψ field and its complex conjugate field ψ* that leave |ψ|2 unchanged, such as

a complex rotation. In the limit when the phase θ becomes infinitesimally small, δθ, it may be taken as the parameter ε, while the Ψ are equal to iψ and −iψ*, respectively. A specific example is the Klein–Gordon equation, the relativistically correct version of the Schrödinger equation for spinless particles, which has the Lagrangian density

In this case, Noether's theorem states that the conserved (∂ ⋅ j = 0) current equals

which, when multiplied by the charge on that species of particle, equals the electric current density due to that type of particle. This "gauge invariance" was first noted by Hermann Weyl, and is one of the prototype gauge symmetries of physics.

Derivations

One independent variable
Consider the simplest case, a system with one independent variable, time. Suppose the dependent variables q are such that the action integral

is invariant under brief infinitesimal variations in the dependent variables. In other words, they satisfy the Euler–Lagrange equations

And suppose that the integral is invariant under a continuous symmetry. Mathematically such a symmetry is represented as a flow, φ, which acts on the variables as follows

where ε is a real variable indicating the amount of flow, and T is a real constant (which could be zero) indicating how much the flow shifts time.

The action integral flows to

which may be regarded as a function of ε. Calculating the derivative at ε = 0 and using Leibniz's rule, we get

Notice that the Euler–Lagrange equations imply

Substituting this into the previous equation, one gets

Again using the Euler–Lagrange equations we get

Substituting this into the previous equation, one gets

From which one can see that

is a constant of the motion, i.e., it is a conserved quantity. Since φ[q, 0] = q, we get  and so the conserved quantity simplifies to

To avoid excessive complication of the formulas, this derivation assumed that the flow does not change as time passes. The same result can be obtained in the more general case.

Field-theoretic derivation
Noether's theorem may also be derived for tensor fields φA where the index A ranges over the various components of the various tensor fields. These field quantities are functions defined over a four-dimensional space whose points are labeled by coordinates xμ where the index μ ranges over time (μ = 0) and three spatial dimensions (μ = 1, 2, 3). These four coordinates are the independent variables; and the values of the fields at each event are the dependent variables. Under an infinitesimal transformation, the variation in the coordinates is written

whereas the transformation of the field variables is expressed as

By this definition, the field variations δφA result from two factors: intrinsic changes in the field themselves and changes in coordinates, since the transformed field αA depends on the transformed coordinates ξμ. To isolate the intrinsic changes, the field variation at a single point xμ may be defined

If the coordinates are changed, the boundary of the region of space–time over which the Lagrangian is being integrated also changes; the original boundary and its transformed version are denoted as Ω and Ω’, respectively.

Noether's theorem begins with the assumption that a specific transformation of the coordinates and field variables does not change the action, which is defined as the integral of the Lagrangian density over the given region of spacetime. Expressed mathematically, this assumption may be written as

where the comma subscript indicates a partial derivative with respect to the coordinate(s) that follows the comma, e.g.

Since ξ is a dummy variable of integration, and since the change in the boundary Ω is infinitesimal by assumption, the two integrals may be combined using the four-dimensional version of the divergence theorem into the following form

The difference in Lagrangians can be written to first-order in the infinitesimal variations as

However, because the variations are defined at the same point as described above, the variation and the derivative can be done in reverse order; they commute

Using the Euler–Lagrange field equations

the difference in Lagrangians can be written neatly as

Thus, the change in the action can be written as

Since this holds for any region Ω, the integrand must be zero

For any combination of the various symmetry transformations, the perturbation can be written

where  is the Lie derivative of φA in the Xμ direction.

These equations imply that the field variation taken at one point equals

Differentiating the above divergence with respect to ε at ε = 0 and changing the sign yields the conservation law

where the conserved current equals

Manifold/fiber bundle derivation
Suppose we have an n-dimensional oriented Riemannian manifold, M and a target manifold T. Let  be the configuration space of smooth functions from M to T. (More generally, we can have smooth sections of a fiber bundle over M.)

Examples of this M in physics include:
 In classical mechanics, in the Hamiltonian formulation, M is the one-dimensional manifold , representing time and the target space is the cotangent bundle of space of generalized positions.
 In field theory, M is the spacetime manifold and the target space is the set of values the fields can take at any given point.

Now suppose there is a functional

called the action.

To get to the usual version of Noether's theorem, we need additional restrictions on the action. We assume  is the integral over M of a function

called the Lagrangian density, depending on φ, its derivative and the position. In other words, for φ in 

Suppose we are given boundary conditions, i.e., a specification of the value of φ at the boundary if M is compact, or some limit on φ as x approaches ∞.

and that φ satisfies the given boundary conditions, is the subspace of on shell solutions. (See principle of stationary action)

for all compact submanifolds N or in other words,

for all x, where we set

If this holds on shell and off shell, we say Q generates an off-shell symmetry. If this only holds on shell, we say Q generates an on-shell symmetry. Then, we say Q is a generator of a one parameter symmetry Lie group.

Now, for any N, because of the Euler–Lagrange theorem, on shell (and only on-shell), we have

Since this is true for any N, we have

But this is the continuity equation for the current  defined by:

which is called the Noether current''' associated with the symmetry. The continuity equation tells us that if we integrate this current over a space-like slice, we get a conserved quantity called the Noether charge (provided, of course, if M is noncompact, the currents fall off sufficiently fast at infinity).

 Comments 
Noether's theorem is an on shell theorem: it relies on use of the equations of motion—the classical path. It reflects the relation between the boundary conditions and the variational principle. Assuming no boundary terms in the action, Noether's theorem implies that

 

The quantum analogs of Noether's theorem involving expectation values (e.g.) probing off shell quantities as well are the Ward–Takahashi identities.

 Generalization to Lie algebras 
Suppose we have two symmetry derivations Q1 and Q2. Then, [Q1, Q2] is also a symmetry derivation. Let us see this explicitly. Let us say

and

Then,

where f12 = Q1[f2μ] − Q2[f1μ]. So,

This shows we can extend Noether's theorem to larger Lie algebras in a natural way.

 Generalization of the proof 
This applies to any local symmetry derivation Q satisfying QS ≈ 0, and also to more general local functional differentiable actions, including ones where the Lagrangian depends on higher derivatives of the fields. Let ε be any arbitrary smooth function of the spacetime (or time) manifold such that the closure of its support is disjoint from the boundary. ε is a test function. Then, because of the variational principle (which does not apply to the boundary, by the way), the derivation distribution q generated by q[ε][Φ(x)] = ε(x)Q[Φ(x)] satisfies q[ε][S] ≈ 0 for every ε, or more compactly, q(x)[S] ≈ 0 for all x not on the boundary (but remember that q(x) is a shorthand for a derivation distribution, not a derivation parametrized by x in general). This is the generalization of Noether's theorem.

To see how the generalization is related to the version given above, assume that the action is the spacetime integral of a Lagrangian that only depends on φ and its first derivatives. Also, assume

Then,

for all .

More generally, if the Lagrangian depends on higher derivatives, then

 Examples 

 Example 1: Conservation of energy 
Looking at the specific case of a Newtonian particle of mass m, coordinate x, moving under the influence of a potential V, coordinatized by time t. The action, S, is:

The first term in the brackets is the kinetic energy of the particle, while the second is its potential energy. Consider the generator of time translations Q = d/dt. In other words, . The coordinate x has an explicit dependence on time, whilst V does not; consequently:

so we can set

Then,

The right hand side is the energy, and Noether's theorem states that  (i.e. the principle of conservation of energy is a consequence of invariance under time translations).

More generally, if the Lagrangian does not depend explicitly on time, the quantity

(called the Hamiltonian) is conserved.

 Example 2: Conservation of center of momentum 
Still considering 1-dimensional time, let

or  Newtonian particles where the potential only depends pairwise upon the relative displacement.

For , consider the generator of Galilean transformations (i.e. a change in the frame of reference). In other words,

And

This has the form of  so we can set

Then,

Noether's theorem states:

 Example 3: Conformal transformation 

Both examples 1 and 2 are over a 1-dimensional manifold (time). An example involving spacetime is a conformal transformation of a massless real scalar field with a quartic potential in (3 + 1)-Minkowski spacetime.

For Q, consider the generator of a spacetime rescaling. In other words,

And

This has the form of

(where we have performed a change of dummy indices) so set

Then

Noether's theorem states that  (as one may explicitly check by substituting the Euler–Lagrange equations into the left hand side).

If one tries to find the Ward–Takahashi analog of this equation, one runs into a problem because of anomalies.

 Applications 
Application of Noether's theorem allows physicists to gain powerful insights into any general theory in physics, by just analyzing the various transformations that would make the form of the laws involved invariant. For example:

 Invariance of an isolated system with respect to spatial translation (in other words, that the laws of physics are the same at all locations in space) gives the law of conservation of linear momentum (which states that the total linear momentum of an isolated system is constant)
 Invariance of an isolated system with respect to time translation (i.e. that the laws of physics are the same at all points in time) gives the law of conservation of energy (which states that the total energy of an isolated system is constant)
 Invariance of an isolated system with respect to rotation (i.e., that the laws of physics are the same with respect to all angular orientations in space) gives the law of conservation of angular momentum (which states that the total angular momentum of an isolated system is constant)
 Invariance of an isolated system with respect to Lorentz boosts (i.e., that the laws of physics are the same with respect to all inertial reference frames) gives the center-of-mass theorem (which states that the center-of-mass of an isolated system moves at a constant velocity). 

In quantum field theory, the analog to Noether's theorem, the Ward–Takahashi identity, yields further conservation laws, such as the conservation of electric charge from the invariance with respect to a change in the phase factor of the complex field of the charged particle and the associated gauge of the electric potential and vector potential.

The Noether charge is also used in calculating the entropy of stationary black holes.

See also

Conservation law
Charge (physics)
Gauge symmetry
Gauge symmetry (mathematics)
Invariant (physics)
Goldstone boson
Symmetry in physics

 Notes 

References

 
 Online copy.

 

External links
 
  (Original in Gott. Nachr.'' 1918:235–257)

 

 
Noether's Theorem at MathPages.

 
 

 Google Tech Talk, (June 16, 2010) 

Articles containing proofs
Calculus of variations
Conservation laws
Concepts in physics
Partial differential equations
Physics theorems
Quantum field theory
Symmetry
Theoretical physics